The Demon of Kolno is a 1921 German silent film directed by Hanna Henning and starring Max Ruhbeck, and Ernst Dernburg.

The film's art direction was by Julian Ballenstedt.

Cast

References

Bibliography

External links

1921 films
Films of the Weimar Republic
Films directed by Hanna Henning
German silent feature films
Films about hypnosis
Films set in Russia
Films based on German novels
German black-and-white films